The special election for Illinois's 18th congressional district was held on September 10, 2015, between Republican Darin LaHood and Democrat Rob Mellon to fill the remainder of the term of Republican Aaron Schock, who resigned on March 31, 2015. LaHood won the election with almost 69% of the vote.

History

Schock announced on March 17, 2015, that he would resign on March 31, 2015, following allegations of improper spending of political campaign funds and an impending ethics investigation.

According to Illinois state law, Governor Bruce Rauner must call the special election within five days after Schock's resignation becoming official, and it must be held within 115 days of the call.  This would mean that the latest possible day for the election under Illinois law would have been July 29, 2015.  However, in order to comply with the federal Uniformed and Overseas Citizens Absentee Voting Act (UOCAVA), the general election was set for September 10, 2015, with party primaries to be held on July 7.

In April 2015, the Marshall County and McLean County governments requested that Schock or his campaign fund reimburse the counties for the special election costs, and two other counties are considering similar action.  Stark County declined to request reimbursement, as it still had $12,000 left over from the April consolidated election and Schock had not been convicted of a crime.

Republican primary

Candidates

Declared
 Mike Flynn, political strategist and online journalist at Breitbart News
 Darin LaHood, State Senator and son of former U.S. Representative Ray LaHood
 Donald Rients, former corrections officer

Withdrawn
 Mark Zalcman, attorney. Zalcman stated that he was forced to withdraw because a limited time to file petitions was "done purposely by the Governor to insure that Darin LaHood would not have to face any grassroots opposition in the campaign," and that he would focus on the regular March 2016 primary. Zalcman did not file for the seat in 2016.

Declined
 Jason Barickman, state senator
 Bill Brady, state senator, nominee for governor in 2010, and candidate for governor in 2006 and 2014
 Dan Brady, State Representative
 Ed Brady, real estate developer
 Tom Demmer, state representative
 Robert Kent Gray, Jr., attorney and Lincoln Land Community College Trustee
 Bobby Schilling, former U.S. Representative for Illinois's 17th congressional district
 Ryan Spain, Peoria City Councilman
 Jil Tracy, former state representative and candidate for lieutenant governor in 2014
 Michael D. Unes, state representative

Endorsements

Incumbent and prior state elected officials
Bruce Rauner, Republican governor of Illinois
Jim Edgar, former Republican governor of Illinois

Incumbent and prior members of the U.S. House of Representatives
Peter Roskam, congressman for IL-6
Mike Bost, congressman for IL-12
Rodney Davis, congressman for IL-13
Randy Hultgren, congressman for IL-14
John Shimkus, congressman for IL-15
Adam Kinzinger, congressman for IL-16
Bobby Schilling, former congressman for IL-17
Joe Walsh, former congressman for IL-8
Thomas W. Ewing, former congressman for IL-15

Incumbent Illinois legislative officials
Jason Barickman, state senator for IL-53
Bill Brady, state senator for IL-44
Chapin Rose, state senator for IL-51
Sam McCann, state senator for IL-50
Kyle McCarter, state senator for IL-54
Jim Oberweis, state senator for IL-25
Dan Brady, state representative for IL-105
Keith P. Sommer, state representative for IL-88
Tom Morrison, state representative for IL-54

Other people
Dan Proft, conservative talk radio host and candidate for Illinois governor in 2010
Penny Pullen, former Illinois state representative and conservative activist
Paul Schimpf, former Republican nominee for Illinois Attorney General in 2014

Organizations
National Right to Life
National Rifle Association
United States Chamber of Commerce

Newspapers
Journal Star

Ted Cruz, Republican United States Senator from Texas and candidate for President of the United States in 2016
Mark Levin, conservative talk radio host
Steve King, congressman for Iowa's 4th congressional district
Louie Gohmert, congressman for Texas's 1st congressional district
Richard Viguerie, conservative activist and chairman of ConservativeHQ.com
Stephen Moore, economic writer and policy analyst, founder and former president of the Club for Growth, and chief economist of The Heritage Foundation
Erick Erickson, conservative blogger and editor-in-chief and CEO of RedState

Results

Democratic primary

Candidates

Declared
 Adam Lopez, member of the Springfield School Board and a Country Financial representative
 Rob Mellon, teacher and candidate in 2014

Declined
 Colleen Callahan,  State Director for USDA Rural Development and nominee in 2008
 Sonni Choi Williams, deputy corporation counsel for the City of Peoria
 Kristin Dicenso, advisor for the Illinois Department of Transportation
 Jehan Gordon-Booth, State Representative
 Dave Koehler, State Senator
 Andy Manar, State Senator
 John M. Sullivan, State Senator

Results

General election

Predictions

Finance Reports

Results

See also
List of special elections to the United States House of Representatives

References

External links
 Mike Flynn for Congress
 Darin Lahood for Congress
 Donald Rients for Congress
 Rob Mellon for Congress

Illinois 2015 18
Illinois 2015 18
2015 18 Special
Illinois 18 Special
United States House of Representatives 18 Special
United States House of Representatives 2015 18